Earl Carver Turner (27 March 1884 – 6 November 1971) was a film editor of the Frank Buck serial Jungle Menace.

Early years
Earl Turner was born in Nebraska and was the son of James R Turner, a telegraph operator, and Mary Elizabeth Stanfield. Earl grew up and worked on a farm in Indiana.

Career
During World War I, Turner worked as a film editor for Triangle Film Corporation. Turner was film editor of The Phantom Empire, Batman and Robin, Batman (1943), East Side Kids and many other movies.

Work with Frank Buck
In 1937, Turner was a film editor of the Frank Buck serial Jungle Menace.

Later life
Turner died aged 87 in Glendale, California.

Selected filmography
 The Range Riders (1927)
 His Last Bullet (1928)
 The Saddle King (1929)

References

External links
 
 

1884 births
1971 deaths
People from Nebraska
American film editors